was a Rinzai Buddhist temple and royal bodaiji of the Ryūkyū Kingdom, in Naha, Okinawa.

The temple was erected during the reign of King Shō Shin (r. 1477–1526), the first abbot being Kaiin Shōko. It was also used as bodaiji of Ryukyuan kings. Ryukyuan kings would visit Enkaku-ji, Tennō-ji and Tenkai-ji after their genpuku and investiture.

Enkaku-ji was recognized as a national treasure of Japan in 1933, but it was destroyed in the 1945 battle of Okinawa. The government of Okinawa Prefecture began plans to reconstruct its sanmon in 2014.

See also
Tennō-ji (Okinawa)
Tenkai-ji
Sōgen-ji

References 

Religious buildings and structures completed in 1494
Buddhist archaeological sites in Japan
Buddhist temples in Okinawa Prefecture
Buildings and structures in Japan destroyed during World War II
1945 disestablishments in Japan
Buddhism in the Ryukyu Islands
Buddhism in the Muromachi period
Rinzai temples
Jongmyo shrines